Garrett Lindholm (born August 10, 1988) is an American football placekicker who is currently a free agent. He played for Tarleton State in college. He is best known for kicking a 64-yard field goal to send Tarleton to overtime against Texas A&M–Kingsville in his senior season.

Professional career

Early career
Lindholm signed with the Atlanta Falcons in 2013, but was released in July. Lindholm was claimed off waivers by the Indianapolis Colts, where he played in 3 preseason games mostly as a kickoff specialist. He was released priors to the Colts 3rd preseason game.

Milwaukee Mustangs
In 2011, Lindholm was assigned to the Milwaukee Mustangs of the Arena Football League (AFL).

St. Louis Rams
Lindholm played the 2012 preseason with the St. Louis Rams. Lindholm received an opportunity to kick for the Rams, but was competing with Greg Zuerlein who was drafted, and eventually won the job. Lindholm was released following the Rams' 3rd preseason game.

Arizona Rattlers
In 2013, Lindholm was assigned to the Arizona Rattlers. Lindholm lead the AFL in Field Goals made (7), and was the league leader in points (179). Lindholm was named the AFL's Kicker of the Year following the conclusion of the regular season. His longest made field goal was from 47 yards. His efforts helped the Rattlers capture their second consecutive ArenaBowl Championship.

San Antonio Talons
On January 30, 2014, Lindholm was assigned to the San Antonio Talons.

New Orleans VooDoo
On March 26, 2015, Lindholm was assigned to the New Orleans VooDoo. When the VooDoo ceased operations August 9, 2015, Lindholm became a free agent.

Orlando Predators
On August 12, 2015, Lindholm was assigned to the Orlando Predators.

Los Angeles KISS
On August 6, 2016, Lindholm was assigned to the Los Angeles KISS.

References

External links
NFL bio
Tarleton State bio

1988 births
Living people
Tarleton State Texans football players
Milwaukee Mustangs (2009–2012) players
Arizona Rattlers players
San Antonio Talons players
New Orleans VooDoo players
Orlando Predators players
Los Angeles Kiss players
American football placekickers
People from Pflugerville, Texas